Sang Xue (Chinese: , Sāng Xuě; b. 7 December 1984 in Tianjin) is a female Chinese diver and former Olympian. She won the gold medal in the Synchronized 10m Platform competition at the 2000 Summer Olympics. She and her partner Li Na beat the Canadian team by 33 points.

External links
 profile

1984 births
Living people
Chinese female divers
Divers at the 2000 Summer Olympics
Olympic divers of China
Olympic gold medalists for China
Sportspeople from Tianjin
Olympic medalists in diving
Medalists at the 2000 Summer Olympics
World Aquatics Championships medalists in diving
21st-century Chinese women